Hans Wimmer (born 19 March 1907 in Pfarrkirchen; died 31 August 1992 in Munich) was a German sculptor.

External links 

1907 births
1992 deaths
20th-century German sculptors
20th-century German male artists
German male sculptors
Knights Commander of the Order of Merit of the Federal Republic of Germany
Recipients of the Pour le Mérite (civil class)